Guanosine (symbol G or Guo) is a purine nucleoside comprising guanine attached to a ribose (ribofuranose) ring via a β-N9-glycosidic bond. Guanosine can be phosphorylated to become guanosine monophosphate (GMP), cyclic guanosine monophosphate (cGMP), guanosine diphosphate (GDP), and guanosine triphosphate (GTP). These forms play important roles in various biochemical processes such as synthesis of nucleic acids and proteins, photosynthesis, muscle contraction, and intracellular signal transduction (cGMP). When guanine is attached by its N9 nitrogen to the C1 carbon of a deoxyribose ring it is known as deoxyguanosine.

Physical and chemical properties
Guanosine is a white, crystalline powder with no odor and mild saline taste.
It is very soluble in acetic acid, slightly soluble in water, insoluble in ethanol, diethyl ether, benzene and chloroform.

Functions
Guanosine is required for an RNA splicing reaction in mRNA, when a "self-splicing" intron removes itself from the mRNA message by cutting at both ends, re-ligating, and leaving just the exons on either side to be translated into protein.

Uses
The antiviral drug acyclovir, often used in herpes treatment, and the anti-HIV drug abacavir, are structurally similar to guanosine. Guanosine was also used to make regadenoson.

Sources
Guanosine can be found in pancreas, clover, coffee plant, and pollen of pines.

References

Nucleosides
Purines
Hydroxymethyl compounds